In molecular biology mir-361 microRNA is a short RNA molecule. MicroRNAs function to regulate the expression levels of other genes by several mechanisms. For example, miR-361-5p might act as a suppressor in triple-negative breast cancer (TNBC) by targeting RQCD1 to inhibit the EGFR/PI3K/Akt signaling pathway.

See also 
 MicroRNA

References

Further reading

External links 
 

MicroRNA
MicroRNA precursor families